Wayne Thomas (born 2 September 1958) is a Welsh former professional footballer who spent the majority of his career playing in Germany.

Career
Thomas was active in German professional football since 1978. After appearances in the 2. Bundesliga at KSV Baunatal and at Alemannia Aachen, he moved in the 1983–84 Bundesliga season to newly promoted side Bayer 05 Uerdingen, where he became a regular player. His biggest success with the Krefeldern was winning the DFB-Pokal in 1985. In the 2–1 final victory against the Bayern Munich, Thomas came on as a substitute.

In 1985, he joined the Bundesliga promoted Hannover 96, with which he descended directly and then immediately rose again. In the 1986–87 Bundesliga season, he completed only three appearances, before he switched back to the second division to Kickers Offenbach.

Wayne Thomas's younger brother Dean Thomas was active as a pro in Germany. He came to first and second division appearances for Alemannia Aachen and Fortuna Dusseldorf.

Honours
Bayer Uerdingen
 DFB-Pokal: 1984–85

References

1958 births
KFC Uerdingen 05 players
Hannover 96 players
Welsh footballers
Welsh expatriate sportspeople in Germany
Footballers from Coventry
Alemannia Aachen players
Kickers Offenbach players
Association football midfielders
Living people
Expatriate footballers in Germany
Expatriate footballers in West Germany
Welsh expatriate sportspeople in West Germany
Welsh expatriate footballers
2. Bundesliga players
Bundesliga players